Bittium exile is a species of minute sea snail, a marine gastropod mollusc or micromollusc in the family Cerithiidae, the cerithiids. It occurs only in New Zealand.

References

Cerithiidae
Gastropods of New Zealand
Taxa named by Frederick Hutton (scientist)
Gastropods described in 1873